Don Hilary Gingery (February 19, 1884 – October 15, 1961) was a Democratic member of the U.S. House of Representatives from Pennsylvania.

Biography
Don Gingery was born in Woodland, Pennsylvania, and moved to Clearfield, Pennsylvania, in 1892. He attended the Mercersburg Academy, and the Ohio Northern University at Ada, Ohio. He was engaged in the hardware and mine-supply business from 1902 to 1934, and also as a civil engineer in 1903. Gingery was a member of the Pennsylvania State House of Representatives in 1915 and 1916. He served in the Pennsylvania National Guard, in grades from private to captain from 1902 to 1906. He was chairman of the Clearfield County, Pennsylvania, Democratic committee in 1916 and 1917, and a member of the Democratic State committee in 1919 and 1920. He was a member of the official delegation attending the inauguration of President Manuel L. Quezon of the Philippines at Manila, in 1935.

Gingery was elected as a Democrat to the Seventy-fourth and Seventy-fifth Congresses. He was an unsuccessful candidate for reelection in 1938. He was associated with the Bituminous Coal Division of the Coal Mines Administration, and the Solid Fuels Administration for War of the United States Department of the Interior, at Altoona, Pennsylvania, from 1939 to 1946. He was a delegate to 1948 Democratic National Convention from Pennsylvania. He died in Clearfield and is buried in Hillcrest Cemetery.

References

The Political Graveyard

Democratic Party members of the Pennsylvania House of Representatives
1884 births
1961 deaths
American civil engineers
United States Army officers
Ohio Northern University alumni
Democratic Party members of the United States House of Representatives from Pennsylvania
20th-century American politicians
People from Clearfield, Pennsylvania
Engineers from Pennsylvania
Military personnel from Pennsylvania